Beta Upsilon Chi is the largest Christian social fraternity in the United States. Since its founding at the University of Texas in 1985, ΒΥΧ has spread to twenty-nine campuses.

According to the fraternity's official website, Beta Upsilon Chi "exists for the purpose of establishing brotherhood and unity among college men based on the common bond of Jesus Christ." The founding verse of BYX is "Behold how good and how pleasant it is for brothers to dwell together in unity." - Psalm 133:1. BYX seeks to set itself apart from other fraternities in its incorporation of cell groups where, separate from weekly fraternity meetings, small groups gather weekly to edify college men through Bible study, worship, accountability, prayer, and fellowship to promote brotherhood among members.

History

Founding of the Alpha chapter
ΒΥΧ was founded at the University of Texas at Austin in 1985 by the national founding fathers, and began with the vision of Craig Albert, the first president. This group of men saw the lasting bonds of deep friendship that Greek life fostered and felt that such an order, dedicated to Christ and the edification of one another, could lead to a powerful social witness on their campus.

As an alternative to what was seen as the "normal" fraternity scene, the founding fathers of Beta Upsilon Chi established their fraternity as Brothers Under Christ, and took the Greek letters Beta, Upsilon, and Chi to identify themselves. They chose to make public their true name, Brothers Under Christ, so that they might always wear the name of Christ and demonstrate that one could remain true to one's faith and yet enjoy life in fellowship with others. To announce the founding of their fraternity, the founding fathers organized the first Island Party on the campus of the University of Texas. Chapters around the country now hold their own Island Parties annually as an evangelical outreach to the chapters' respective campuses and communities.

Founding fathers of Alpha chapter

 Craig Albert
 Jeff Miller
 Erik Bradford
 Tim Miller
 Michael Brown
 Stuart Nolley
 David Cortright
 Keith Onishi
 David Daniels
 Steve Patrick

 John Douglas
 Roger Poupart
 John Edson
 Don Reid
 Richard Foster
 Brian Rynne
 Jeff Garrett
 Kenneth Sapp
 David Givens
 Garland Spiller

 Steve Hoehner
 Clayton Walther
 Clayton Jewett
 Wendel Weaver
 Scott Love
 John Wilson
 Mark McGee
 Greg Young
 Tse-Horng Yu

Going national
The process of growing from one chapter in Austin, Texas, to a national organization across the country was slow at first. Initially, the alpha chapter rejected requests from Christian men at other schools to be initiated into the fraternity or to start new chapters. Eventually, the leadership in Austin decided that Beta Upsilon Chi's success should be shared with other campuses, and the founding fathers of Beta chapter were initiated at Texas Christian University in Fort Worth, Texas.  The fraternity then quickly expanded its presence across Texas, starting the Gamma and Delta chapters at Texas A&M University and Stephen F. Austin State University, respectively.

Today the national fraternity is headquartered in Fort Worth, and an expansion program oversees the establishment of new chapters.

Inspiration for new fraternities

The influence of Beta Upsilon Chi, Brothers Under Christ, on the Christian fraternity movement has been significant. What has been characterized as the Texas movement was associated with the rise of the Evangelical Christian movement and the founding of Beta Upsilon Chi in 1985.

In 1988, only three years after BYX's founding, women from Texas established Sigma Phi Lambda, or Sisters for the Lord. Sigma Phi Lambda was influenced by BYX in their development, with Phi Lamb's establishment designed to be a "female version of BYX." Their official name, Sisters for the Lord, and their system of "cable groups" closely mirrors BYX.

Controversies 
The Fraternity had been involved in several court cases seeking to assert local chapters' rights to organize with leaders, or to include as members, those who share the organization's Christian beliefs. Until these court cases three universities held that student organizations may not discriminate on the basis of religion, among other things, and had asserted this blanket prohibition applies to religious student organizations. In each of these the Fraternity has prevailed, and three universities have changed their policies. These include:

University of Georgia 
In late 2006, the Pi chapter of Beta Upsilon Chi at the University of Georgia was prevented from registering as a student organization by university officials "because the group requires its members and officers to share the group's Christian beliefs". After months of negotiation between university officials, student officers of the local chapter, and officials at the fraternity's national headquarters in Texas, attorneys with the Christian Legal Society and Alliance Defense Fund filed a civil rights suit on December 5, 2006, in the United States District Court for the Middle District of Georgia against the University on behalf of the fraternity.

Five days later, on December 10, published reports by the Associated Press indicated that the university would "remove the religion clause from the [university's anti-discrimination] policy for the Christian fraternity to settle this particular situation and is discussing an exception to religious discrimination [that] could be put into place much like an exception to gender discrimination is in place for same-sex social fraternities and sororities."

University of Missouri 
Ten students formed a chapter at the University of Missouri, Columbia, in April 2006. In December of that year a university administrator notified them that the chapter would have to abide by campus prohibitions on discrimination based on "race, color, religion, national origin, ancestry, age, gender, sexual orientation, disability" or status as a Vietnam War veteran. The students objected, with assistance from the Christian Legal Society, which sent university officials a letter listing several legal precedents protecting religious student groups' First Amendment rights of free association. In response, the university quickly reversed the directive.

University of Florida 
On March 16, 2007, the Upsilon chapter at the University of Florida was officially recognized by the BYX national board. The University of Florida however, refused to recognize BYX. The university had refused to recognize the chapter as a registered student organization because the fraternity did not accept non-Christians, and would not recognize the chapter as a social fraternity because it was too exclusive. On July 10, 2007, the Alliance Defense Fund Center for Academic Freedom and the Christian Legal Society filed suit on behalf of BYX against various officials from the University of Florida for various constitutional violations. During the course of the legal proceedings, the 11th Circuit Court ruled that the university must recognize the chapter pending appeal. Ultimately, the case was dismissed as moot when the university amended its policies to accommodate the chapter.

Local chapter misconduct claims

Vanderbilt University
On February 10, 2010, Vanderbilt school officials began an investigation into the pledgeship activities of the Nu chapter of BYX after allegations of hazing surfaced. The investigation concluded 18 days later with the chapter being allowed to resume all activities as usual.  No repercussions or disciplinary actions were announced.

On November 4, 2010, two anonymous former members of the Vanderbilt chapter, an alumnus and a senior student, alleged they were evicted from the fraternity for being gay. If the allegations were true, then BYX could be found to have violated Vanderbilt policies against discrimination on the basis of sexual orientation. According to the initial report in Vanderbilt's student newspaper, the Hustler (which first published the anonymous allegations), the BYX code of conduct prohibits homosexual activity by its members (along with fornication by heterosexual members).

The university's dean of students was unwilling to take action against the fraternity based on the published accounts. The dean of students did initiate a review of BYX's policies after an anonymous complaint was lodged against the fraternity in late November 2010. As of 2017, BYX remains an active, registered student organization at Vanderbilt.

Organization

Board of directors
At the national level, ΒΥΧ is headed by a board of directors. This board is the ultimate authority in the fraternity and is responsible for the guidance of the fraternity.

The board also comprises the governing body of the Beta Upsilon Chi corporation, a 501(c)(3) organization, which controls the assets of the fraternity. They appoint the national executive director to run the fraternity's daily business. In conjunction with this executive director, they approve any charter changes.

All members of the board of directors must be alumni of the fraternity, and new members are appointed from the board of advisors. The current members  of the national board of directors are:
 Wendel Weaver (Chairman), Texas, Alpha
 Loren Hsiao, Texas A&M, Gamma
 Brett Williams, Texas, A&M Gamma

Board of advisors
The Board of directors is assisted in its governance of the fraternity by a board of advisors. This board serves as a consultative partner of the board of directors, with voice but no vote in the directors' decisions.

Board of advisors members are appointed by the board of directors, in consultation with the national executive director. All members of the board of advisors must be alumni of the fraternity, and only alumni of chartered chapters may be appointed to the board. The current members of the National Board of Advisors are:

 Jared Lyda (Operation Director), Texas A&M, Gamma
 Preston Morris, University of Tennessee, Alpha Zeta
 Gabe McKinney, Texas A&M, Gamma
 Alex Housewright, Baylor, Iota
 Cody Carroll, LA Tech, Alpha Xi

Executive director
The BYX executive director is the fraternity's national administrator. Through his staff, he coordinates the activities of the fraternity from its headquarters in Fort Worth, Texas. The executive director's staff is equally responsible for the day-to-day operation of the national fraternity, and staff from National Headquarters frequently visit the chapters. The national executive director is an ex officio member of the board of directors; he has a voice in decisions, but no vote.

The following men have served as executive director of Beta Upsilon Chi:
 Kyle Hoover, 1999–2001
 Kevin Peck, 2001–2004
 Jason Hoyt, 2004–2017
 Brian Lee, 2018–Present

Chapter governance
Chapters are authorized by a charter from the National Board of Directors and denominated by a letter of the Greek alphabet that corresponds with their order of admission into the fraternity (for example, the University of Texas is Alpha chapter).

The charter authorizes each chapter to work under a chapter constitution that provides for the election of chapter officers: typically a president, vice president, secretary, treasurer, chaplain, and a pledge trainer, sometimes called a New Member Captain.
These officers are responsible for the administration of the chapter for a calendar year, including conducting ritual, overseeing meetings, organizing trips, implementing the pledging program, and organizing parties.  The officers serve one-year terms, and may be re-elected only once to a different office.

National meetings
In the beginnings, once each year, the chapter officers gather together for a National Leadership Conference, which consists of all the officers of the fraternity and the national staff. This meeting is in the fall, and shortly follows the election of the local chapter leaders.

In the early spring of even-numbered years, the entire fraternity is called together for National Summit, typically held outside of Dallas, Texas. The event is the primary unifying experience of BYX members outside of their common commitment to Christ and their shared experience in ritual and ceremony of the fraternity. Its Bible studies, worship, fellowship, athletic competitions, and seminars on fraternity issues attract the largest gatherings of Brothers Under Christ in any given year. It is also at Summit where the fraternity's annual Delegate Convention takes place.

Affiliating with local universities
Since its inception in 1985, chapters of Beta Upsilon Chi have chosen not to affiliate with the Interfraternity Council (IFC) at the school where they are established. This has proven controversial on some campuses, because it means that BYX does not pay IFC dues. On the other hand, IFC membership sometimes involves sanctioning rules and regulations which would be contrary to the purpose of BYX.  Because of the potential for conflict inherent in such affiliations, the National Board of Directors continues to uphold a policy prohibiting local chapters from affiliating with host university IFCs. As a result, depending on the university, each chapter is either registered as a social fraternity unassociated with the IFC, or as a student organization. The Alpha Eta chapter at Clemson University, the Omicron chapter at Mississippi State University, and the Pi chapter at the University of Georgia are exceptions, affiliating with their local IFCs in 2014, 2015, and 2017 respectively.

On a national basis, Beta Upsilon Chi became a member of the NIC on 22 Sept 2016, to "align itself with the fraternal movement " and access advocacy and resources that will elevate its value in higher education, said Jason Hoyt, Beta Upsilon Chi President and COO.

Membership

There are three kinds of membership in the Fraternity: pledges, active members, and alumni members. Each local chapter is composed of its active members and pledges.

Active members form the backbone of the fraternity, participating in ritual, leading worship, Bible study, and other chapter activities. Active members have voting rights within the chapter and become alumni members upon their graduation. Pledges become members by finishing the pledging process, a process that differs from chapter to chapter, but typically lasts a semester.

Cell groups
All BYX members are a part of "cell groups," which are groups of four to six brothers and pledges who meet weekly for social activities and Bible study.

Events 
Most Beta Upsilon Chi chapters host between two and four parties a semester. 

Like other fraternities, BYX usually hosts one or two formals per semester for their members. Unlike parties, formals are by invitation only, meaning only members and their invited dates are open to attend.

BYX chapters hold one weekend retreat a semester.

Traditions and symbols
 
As with other Greek letter organizations, Beta Upsilon Chi is a ritualistic organization whose pledge induction, initiation, and other ceremonies are esoteric and not open to the general public.

In addition to the usual Greek practices of grips, words, and memory work, Beta Upsilon Chi also utilizes several symbols whose meaning is open to anyone:

Purpose. To establish brotherhood and unity among college men based on the common bond of Jesus Christ.
 Founding Scripture. "Behold how good and how pleasant it is for brothers to dwell together in unity." - Psalm 133:1
 Colors.  Purple and white.
  Signature event. "Island Party" (IP) - a free Christian music concert or event provided to the entire university, the largest of which was held at Baylor University (Iota chapter) on April 20, 2007. The band "Switchfoot" was the headliner and attendance was estimated between 15,000 and 20,000.

Chapters
Beta Upsilon Chi changed its policy regarding expansion of chapters in February 2009.  The fraternity's board of directors, in consultation with its board of advisors, continued the implementation of a three-phased expansion progress for prospective chapters to pursue active chapter status, but the national leadership began actively recruiting individuals to establish BYX chapters on those campuses which do not already have them.

Current chapters

The fraternity is currently composed of thirty-three active chapters

Notable alumni
 Ben Rector, Arkansas 2009 - singer/songwriter
 Tyler Toney, Garrett Hilbert, Cody Jones, Coby and Cory Cotton, Texas A&M 2009-11 - members of the sports and comedy group Dude Perfect

See also
List of social fraternities and sororities

References

External links
 

 
Student organizations established in 1985
Christian organizations established in 1985
University of Texas at Austin
Organizations based in Fort Worth, Texas
1985 establishments in Texas